OctoArts Films (also known as OctoArts Films International for foreign films) is a Filipino film production and distribution company founded in 1989 by Orly R. Ilacad. A veteran record producer, Ilacad only decided to establish the film company when producer Simon Ongpin agreed to be its head.

List of films
Iputok Mo... Dadapa Ako! (Hard to Die) (1990)
Mayor Latigo: Ang Barakong Alkalde ng Baras (1991)
Ali in Wonderland (1992)
Kalabang Mortal ni Baby Ama (1992)
Boboy Salonga: Batang Tondo (1992)
Working Students (1992)
Ano Ba 'Yan? (1992)
Bakit Labis Kitang Mahal (1992)
Beloy Montemayor: Tirador ng Cebu (1993)
Dahil Mahal Kita: The Dolzura Cortez Story (1993)
Mama's Boys: Mga Praningning (1993)
Ano Ba 'Yan 2 (1993)
Paniwalaan Mo Ako (1993)
Loretta (1993)
Pwera Biro Mahal Kita: Da Beach Boys (1994)
Manolo en Michelle: Hapi Together (1994)
Mama's Boys 2: Let's Go Na! (1994)
Si Ayala at si Zobel (1994) with Cinemax Studios and Viva Films
Manila Girl: Ikaw ang Aking Panaginip (1995) with Viva Films
Isko: Adventures in Animasia (1995)
Muntik ng Maabot ang Langit (1995) with Mahogany Pictures
Rubberman (1996)
Leon Cordero: Duwag Lang ang Hahalik sa Lupa (1996)
Maginoong Barumbado (1996) with RS Productions
Lab en Kisses (1997) with M-Zet Films and Cinemax Studios
Kamandag Ko ang Papatay sa Iyo (1997)
Halik ng Bampira (1997)
Malikot Na Mundo (Cinemax Studios) (1997)
May Sayad (1997)
Guevarra: Sa Batas Ko, Walang Hari (1997)
Frame Up (1997) with Cinemax Studios
Bastardo (1997) with Cinemax Studios
Selosa (1997)
Anting-Anting  (1998)
Marahas: Walang Kilalang Batas (1998) with Cinemax Studios
D' Sisters: Nuns of the Above (1999) with GMA Films and M-Zet Films
Bakit Pa? (1999) with GMA Films
Bestman: 4 Better, Not 4 Worse (2002) with Maverick Films
Lastikman (2003) 
Fantastic Man (2003)
Enteng Kabisote: Okay ka, Fairy Ko: The Legend (2004)
Spirit of the Glass (2004) with Canary Films
Enteng Kabisote 2: Okay Ka Fairy Ko: The Legend Continues (2005)
Enteng Kabisote 3: Okay Ka, Fairy Ko: The Legend Goes On and On and On (2006)
Matakot Ka sa Karma (2006) with Canary Films
Enteng Kabisote 4: Okay Ka Fairy Ko...The Beginning of the Legend (2007)
Iskul Bukol 20 Years After (2008)  with APT Entertainment and M-Zet Productions
Love on Line (LOL) (2009)  with APT Entertainment and M-Zet Productions
Ang Darling Kong Aswang (2009)  with APT Entertainment and M-Zet Productions 
Here Comes the Bride (2010)  with Star Cinema and Quantum Films 
Si Agimat at si Enteng Kabisote (2010)  with GMA Pictures, APT Entertainment, Imus Productions, and M-Zet Productions
Pak! Pak! My Dr. Kwak! (2011)  with Star Cinema, APT Entertainment, and M-Zet Productions
Wedding Tayo, Wedding Hindi (2011)  with Star Cinema 
My House Husband: Ikaw Na! (2011)
Enteng Ng Ina Mo (2011)  with Star Cinema, APT Entertainment, and M-Zet Productions
Si Agimat, si Enteng Kabisote at si Ako (2012)  with APT Entertainment, M-Zet Productions, Imus Productions, and GMA Films 
My Little Bossings (2013)  with APT Entertainment, M-Zet Productions and Kris Aquino Productions 
My Big Bossing (2014)  with APT Entertainment and M-Zet Productions 
My Bebe Love (2015)  with GMA Pictures, APT Entertainment, MEDA Productions and M-Zet Productions
Enteng Kabisote 10 and the Abangers (2016)  with M-Zet Productions and APT Entertainment
Spirit of the Glass: The Haunted (2017)  with T-Rex Entertainment 
Barbi: D' Wonder Beki (2017)  with M-Zet Productions and T-Rex Entertainment 
Meant to Beh (2017)  with M-Zet Productions and APT Entertainment 
Deadma Walking (2017)  with T-Rex Entertainment 
Through Night and Day (2018)  with Viva Films 
 Ang Pangarap Kong Holdap with Mavx Productions
Nuuk (2019) with Viva Films and Mavx Productions 
 Izla (2021)  with Mavx Productions and ALV Films
Without You (2023) with Mavx Productions and ALV Films 
Special Memory (TBA)with GMA Pictures, Viva Films and CJ E&M

References

Companies based in Quezon City
Film production companies of the Philippines
GMA Pictures
Mass media companies established in 1989
Philippine film studios